Claude Morin (born August 10, 1953 in Saint-Gédéon-de-Beauce, Quebec) is a politician from Quebec, Canada. He was elected as mayor of Saint-Georges, Quebec in the 2013 Quebec municipal elections. Previously, he was an Action démocratique du Québec Member of the National Assembly for the electoral district of Beauce-Sud from 2007 to 2008.

Morin has a bachelor's degree in social sciences from the University of Ottawa.

Before his election, he worked within the Canadian Forces for over 15 years in Lille, France, Quebec and Chilliwack, British Columbia as an officer and director. He also worked at the Canadian Department of National Defense as the human resources director and at the NATO offices in Naples as a director for transportation. He was also a financial adviser for three years.

Morin was elected in the 2007 Quebec election with 57% of the vote.  Liberal incumbent Diane Leblanc finished second with 30% of the vote.  Morin took office on April 12, 2007 and was named the Official Opposition's Shadow Minister for Revenue.  He was defeated in the 2008 election.

He was defeated as a Liberal Party of Canada candidate in Beauce in the 2011 Canadian federal election.

Footnotes

External links
 

1953 births
Living people
Action démocratique du Québec MNAs
People from Saint-Georges, Quebec
University of Ottawa alumni
Candidates in the 2011 Canadian federal election
Quebec candidates for Member of Parliament
Mayors of places in Quebec
Liberal Party of Canada candidates for the Canadian House of Commons